Gunnar Kaiser (born 1976 in Cologne) is a German teacher, writer and political blogger and YouTuber.

Life 
Gunnar Kaiser studied philosophy, German philology, and Romance studies at the University of Cologne. After his state examination, he taught German and philosophy at grammar schools in Bonn and Cologne until 2021.
In 2014, the teacher Kaiser started his activism in the anti-American extreme left movement. He was part of the "Mahnwachen für den Frieden" and supported Vladimir Putin in the first Ukraine conflict. Until 2019 his activities stayed largely unnoticed. His Videos and Blogs just had a few hundred followers. This changed in 2019 when Kaiser turned to the extreme right. He published videos with well known leaders of the "neue Rechte", such as Martin Sellner. This collaboration and his Videos against Covid subsequently led to a certain notoriety in this scene. Today Kaiser works at the mediaportal Apolut, the successor to the KenFm portal, which is monitored by the "Verfassungsschutz" the German counterpart to the FBI.

Literary work 
Kaiser's first novel, Unter der Haut (English: Under The Skin), was published in 2018. The paperback edition was printed by German publishing house Piper, and translations into French, Spanish, Italian, Greek and Turkish followed. In the view of Cornelia Wolter (Neue Ruhr Zeitung), it is a novel about aesthetics, classical and pop music, and bibliophilia.

Positions and criticism 
Milosz Matuschek (Guest Author at NZZ and Schweizer Monat) attests that Gunnar Kaiser has summed up the contradictions of the government measures surrounding funerals, schools, companies and restaurants by comparing them to anti-racism demonstrations in June 2020. Matuschek sees this as a colossal triumph in favor of skeptics of the danger of COVID-19.
Matuschek is a close privat friend of Kaiser and they did a bunch of projects together, like "Appell für freie Debattenräume". After this article, NZZ stopped the short cooperation with both of them.

In 2021 the NZZ Newspaper wrote "Kaiser is on a very wrong way" and attests him and his positions to be ideology-driven while criticising the Identitarian Movement.

Kaiser and Matuschek published the "Appell für freie Debattenräume" (appeal for free debate spaces) about cancel culture and call-out culture. In Kaiser's opinion, cancel culture is about "using threats, threats of violence, actual violence, bullying or shitstorms" to put people under pressure and force them out of the public debate, with perpetrators often remaining anonymous. Often third parties such as organizers, publishers, employers, and platforms are put under pressure to make people seem unacceptable and remove them from public discourse. This new quality is seen by Kaiser as a mix of "exuberant political correctness" towards art and culture and the lack of protest against it, with every kind of protest being politically stigmatized and marginalized.

After moderating a debate on cancel culture for the Friedrich Naumann Foundation (affiliated with the German liberal party FDP), the foundation opened discussions by questioning  Kaiser for "spreading conspiracy theories that belong to the mindset of right-wing populism". - an attitude by the liberal foundation that was noticed in a highly controversial manner.

Gunnar Kaiser has spoken at demonstrations against protective measures taken against COVID-19 ("Querdenken").

Bibliography (selection) 

Non-fictional 
 With Florian Radvan: Ödön von Horváth: Geschichten aus dem Wiener Wald [...] Kopiervorlagen und Module für Unterrichtssequenzen edited by Dieter Wrobel, R. Oldenbourg-Verlag 2010. 
 Wie konnte es nur so weit kommen?, Sodenkamp & Lenz Verlagshaus 2021 
 Der Kult, Rubikon Verlag, 2022 
 Die Ethik des Impfens: Über die Wiedergewinnung der Mündigkeit. Europa Verlag 2022 

Fictional
 letzte gedichte und andere gedichte. Unvernünftige Zahlen Verlag 2013 
 Unter der Haut. Berlin Verlag 2018 
 Piper Publishers 2019 (Paperback Edition).

Sources 

German male writers
German YouTubers
1976 births
Living people